Extermination Angel, The Exterminating Angel or Exterminating Angels may refer to:

 The Exterminating Angel, a 1962 Mexican film by Luis Buñuel
 The Exterminating Angel (opera), a 2015 opera by Thomas Adès based on the 1962 film
 The Exterminating Angels, a 2006 French film by Jean-Claude Brisseau
 Society of the Exterminating Angel, a 19th-century Catholic group, established to kill Spanish liberals
 "Exterminating Angel", a song and single by The Creatures from the album Anima Animus
 "The Exterminating Angel", a 1995 episode of the British comedy series One Foot in the Grave
 A nickname for 16th century French pirate Jacques de Sores

See also
 Angel of Death (disambiguation)